Oceanisphaera avium is a Gram-negative and aerobic bacterium from the genus of Oceanisphaera which has been isolated from the gut of the raptorial bird Aegypius monachus from the Seoul Grand Park Zoo in South Korea.

References 

Aeromonadales
Bacteria described in 2018